Shaquille Johnson (born May 2, 1993) is a Canadian football wide receiver for the Ottawa Redblacks of the Canadian Football League (CFL).

University and junior football
Johnson began his university football career with the McGill Redmen in 2012 and was awarded the Peter Gorman Trophy as the rookie of the year. He sat out for a year to help his mother, who was raising three other children on her own, during which time he played for the GTA Grizzlies of the Canadian Junior Football League (CJFL). He then went on to play for the Western Mustangs of the University of Western Ontario and the London Beefeaters of the CJFL. Johnson, who started playing competitive football in grade 10, credits a football camp at the University of Pittsburgh in his senior year of high school with helping him to realize he had the skills to succeed in the sport.

Professional career

BC Lions
Johnson ran a 4.39 time at the 40-yard dash at a regional CFL combine before being drafted by the BC Lions in the fourth round of the 2016 CFL Draft. He spent most of the 2016 season, on the practice roster before playing in two games with no receptions. Through 15 games in the 2017 season, Johnson had 27 catches with 501 yards and two touchdowns, placing him third on the team in receiving yardage. On January 21, 2021, Johnson signed an extension with the Lions. He played in all 14 regular season games in 2021 where he had 30 catches for 295 yards. He became a free agent upon the expiry of his contract on February 8, 2022.

Ottawa Redblacks
On February 9, 2022, it was announced that Johnson had signed with the Ottawa Redblacks.

Personal life
Johnson's brother, Hakeem Johnson, also plays professional football, but as a defensive back. The two brothers played together for the Lions from 2019 to 2021 and were the fifth set of brothers to play for the Lions, but the first to play on opposite sides of the ball.

References

External links
 Ottawa Redblacks bio

1993 births
Living people
Players of Canadian football from Ontario
Canadian football wide receivers
Sportspeople from Brampton
BC Lions players
Ottawa Redblacks players
Canadian Junior Football League players
McGill Redbirds football players
Western Mustangs football players